Saint-André-le-Gaz station is a railway station serving the town Saint-André-le-Gaz, Isère department, southeastern France. The station is served by regional trains towards Lyon, Grenoble and Chambéry.

References

External links
 

Railway stations in Isère